Camp Kill Yourself may refer to:

CKY (band), a rock band from Pennsylvania, United States
CKY (video series), a series of videos starring Bam Margera
CKY crew, a group of friends and relatives centered around Bam Margera